Little Church of the West is a wedding chapel on the Las Vegas Strip in Paradise, Nevada, United States, that is listed on the United States National Register of Historic Places. Built of redwood, it was intended to be a replica of a typical pioneer town church. It is the oldest building on the Las Vegas Strip.

History

The Little Church of the West opened May 22, 1943 on what became the Las Vegas Strip. The chapel was originally built as part of the Hotel Last Frontier complex on the Strip. It was moved from the north side of the hotel to the south side in 1954. In 1979, to make way for the Fashion Show Mall, the chapel was moved onto the grounds of the Hacienda hotel-casino. In December 1996, when the Hacienda was closed and demolished, the chapel was moved again to its current location on the east side of the Strip, south of the eventual Mandalay Bay resort.

The church was listed on the National Register of Historic Places (NRHP) on September 14, 1992, and is the only building on the Las Vegas Strip to be listed.

In 2002, the church performed 6,000 weddings a year, and more than 250,000 couples had been married there since its opening. In 2017, it celebrated its 75th anniversary and remains the oldest building on the Las Vegas Strip.

Film history 
The church is mentioned in a 1959 episode of Perry Mason titled "The Case of the Startled Stallion".
It appeared in two episodes of the 1978-81 ABC series Vega$, including "Serve, Volley, and Kill" in season one, episode 5. This episode starred Red Buttons as "Reverend" Tommy Cirko.

It appears in the 1964 film Viva Las Vegas, in which the film's characters (played by Elvis Presley and Ann-Margret) recite their vows in the church.

Notable weddings

Betty Grable and Harry James (1943)
 Andy Russell and Della Norell (1945)
 Deanna Durbin and Felix Jackson (1945)
Zsa Zsa Gabor and George Sanders (1949)
Fernando Lamas and Arlene Dahl (1954)
Dinah Washington and Dick Lane (1963)
Judy Garland and Mark Herron (1965)
David Cassidy and Kay Lenz (1977)
Bob Geldof and Paula Yates (1986)
Robert Siil and Donna Heinstra (1982)
Dudley Moore and Brogan Lane (1988)
Redd Foxx and Ka Ha Cho (1991)
Richard Gere and Cindy Crawford (1991)
Noel Gallagher and Meg Matthews (1997)
Billy Bob Thornton and Angelina Jolie (2000)
Billie Piper and Chris Evans (2001)
Jodie Sweetin and Cody Herpin (2007)
Mickey Rooney
Robert Goulet
Buck Owens
David Sanborn
Telly Savalas
Heather Thomas
Mel Tormé
Margaret Whiting
Lars Ulrich
Ian Astbury
Max Blumenthal and Anya Parampil

See also 
List of wedding chapels in Las Vegas

References

External links 

 
 UNLV Architecture Studies Library Tour (South Las Vegas)

Wedding chapels in the Las Vegas Valley
National Register of Historic Places in Clark County, Nevada
Buildings and structures in Paradise, Nevada
Gothic Revival church buildings in Nevada
Commercial buildings on the National Register of Historic Places in Nevada
Churches completed in 1942
1942 establishments in Nevada